was a Japanese politician from Asahikawa, Hokkaido. He was the mayor of Asahikawa City from 1963 to 1974, member of the House of Representatives, construction minister in the Hosokawa Cabinet from 1993 to 1994, and chief Cabinet secretary in the government of Prime Minister Tomiichi Murayama from 1994 to 1995. In 1975 and 1979, Igarashi ran for governor of Hokkaidō as a united front candidate (JSP, JCP, Kōmeitō), but lost both elections to incumbent Naohiro Dōgakinai.

Death
On May 7, 2013, he died of pneumonia at age 87.

References

1926 births
2013 deaths
20th-century Japanese politicians
Recipients of the Order of the Sacred Treasure, 1st class
Politicians from Hokkaido
Mayors of places in Hokkaido
Deaths from pneumonia in Japan
People from Asahikawa